Rhona Lynn Bennett (born May 10, 1976), also known as Miss R&B, is an American singer and actress best known for her recurring role as Nicole on The Jamie Foxx Show. She is currently a member of contemporary R&B female group En Vogue. Bennett began her career doing voiceovers and industrial films before moving into professional theatre and television. Before joining the cast of The Jamie Foxx Show, Rhona was a castmember of the Disney Channel's variety show The All-New Mickey Mouse Club. She is a member of Zeta Phi Beta sorority. She also appeared as Loquatia on the short-lived UPN television sitcom Homeboys in Outer Space during the 1996–97 season.

Career

1991–1999: Mickey Mouse Club and television roles 
Bennett started in music at 11 years of age with ETA Creative Arts Theater, and sang "Christmas Melody" in Goodman Theater. In 1991, she became a Mouseketeer on the '90s revival of The Mickey Mouse Club. She was also part of a spin-off dramedy titled Emerald Cove on the Disney Channel. After the show was cancelled in 1994, Bennett moved to California to continue her career as an actress, landing appearances on several shows, including Living Single and Martin. She also garnered a regular role in the mid-1990s, playing Loquatia on the sitcom Homeboys in Outer Space.

2000–2008: Rhona and En Vogue 
In early 2000, casting director Dee Dee Bradley asked Bennett to join the fourth season of the WB sitcom The Jamie Foxx Show, in which she played Nicole, Jamie's co-worker and singing partner.

Shortly after, in late 2000, Bennett signed with Sony Music under producer Rodney "Darkchild" Jerkins' newfly founded boutique imprint Darkchild Records, where she was given the title "First Lady of Darkchild." Jerkins recruited most of his regular collaborators to work alongside Bennett and him on her self-titled debut album, including Robert "Big Bert" Smith, LaShawn Daniels and his brother Fred Jerkins III. The album's first single, "Satisfied," released in March 2001, became a top five hit on the US Hot Dance Club Play chart the following month, but failed to chart or sell noticeably elsewhere. Following a promotional world trip, further plans to release Rhona were put on hold after a fallout between Sony Music and Darkchild Records. Consequently, the album received a limited Japan-wide release only and Bennett was soon dropped from the label.

In 2002, Bennett landed a leading role opposite Allen Payne in the stage play Men Cry in the Dark (2003), based on the same-titled 1999 novel by Michael Baisden. The following year, Bennett joined En Vogue for a five-year tenure during which she released the album Soul Flower (2004) along with original band members Terry Ellis and Cindy Herron. In 2008, following several years of touring, Bennett left the band amid their 20th Anniversary World Tour due to the return of original member Dawn Robinson. Bennett also performed solo at the American Airlines Center on July 27, 2008, under the Miss R&B moniker, where she helped to raise funds for a new charity for the homeless. Bennett reunited with the members of En Vogue to perform at the American Music Festival on August 29, 2008.

2009–present: Solo projects and return to En Vogue 
Following her departure from En Vogue, Bennett began work on her second solo album The Anticipation of R&B under her own label Tone'n'Rhone Productions. The singer worked with a variety of musicians on the project, including producers J.Y. Park and J.U.S.T.I.C.E. League, as well as guest vocalists such as Brandy, 40 Glocc and her former En Vogue colleagues Ellis and Herron. Preceded by the singles "Range" and "Letting You Go," however, the album was shelved in 2010 due to internal conflicts and insufficient promotion. Bennett later released several songs from The Anticipation of R&B to her SoundCloud account.

In 2012, Bennett rejoined En Vogue after new material by all four original members had failed to materialize again and both Robinson and Jones once more had left the band.
In July 2014, Bennett, Ellis, and Herron signed a new contract with Pyramid Records and began work on the album Electric Café  with mentors Denzil Foster and Thomas McElroy. In November, the trio appeared on the Lifetime holiday film An En Vogue Christmas in which they played fictional versions of themselves, reuniting to perform a benefit concert to save the nightclub where they got their start. The original movie featured En Vogue's hit singles as well as two new tracks and a rendition of "O Holy Night", later released digitally through Ellis and Herron's own label En Vogue Records.

In 2016, Bennett released the single "Take Me There" which was expected to precede a solo EP entitled R&B Gumbo. As with The Anticipation of R&B, the EP failed to materialize.

Discography

Studio albums

Singles

References

External links 

Living people
African-American actresses
African-American women singer-songwriters
American child singers
American mezzo-sopranos
American soul singers
American stage actresses
En Vogue members
Mouseketeers
Actresses from Chicago
1976 births
American television actresses
21st-century American women singers